Ohio University Southern Campus is a satellite campus of Ohio University in Ironton, Ohio. The campus also has an extension in Proctorville, Ohio, and the Ohio Horse Park in Franklin Furnace, Ohio.

The university began in 1956 when it hosted college-level classes in Ironton High School with an initial enrollment of 90 students.

History

Buildings 
The main Ohio University Southern campus in Ironton has four distinct buildings.
 The Collins Center offers student services, including enrollment offices. Four lecture halls, an auditorium, library, and The Southernmost Café. It was the first structure completed on the new campus, completed in 1985.
 The Academic Building contains the Center for Nursing Education, the Caucus Room, a biology and chemistry lab, and the TASC Lab.
 The Riffe Center has numerous classrooms, administration offices and audio/video laboratories.
 The Dingus Technology Building has faculty offices, an auditorium, the art department, two computer labs, nursing labs, and three Ohio University Learning Network rooms.

The Nature Center no longer exists

The Ohio University Proctorville Center in Proctorville has one structure.
 The . structure was completed in September 2006. Ground breaking was held on July 12, 2005 for the new, permanent building.

The Ohio Horse Park in Franklin Furnace has several buildings. Which offers a Therapeutic Riding Course.

Ohio University Southern now has quality childcare for OUS students through a partnership with the Lawrence County Early Childhood Academy.  It is located only  from the Southern Campus in Hanging Rock. The building was a former elementary school for Rock Hill Local School District.

Academics 
Ohio University Southern Campus offers 11 associate degrees and 8 bachelor's degrees.

The Resource Commons 
The library contains 25,000 volumes, 200 periodical subscriptions, as well as microforms, audiovisual materials, CD-ROMS and electronic databases. The Library has a Quiet Study Room and a Group Study Room available for student use.

Nature Center 
The Nature Center at Ohio University Southern no longer exists.

The Ohio Horse Park 
The Ohio Horse Park, located in Franklin Furnace, Ohio, is a large 184 acre (745,000 m²) horse farm. It contains an outdoor show, dressage, indoor and indoor therapy arena. It has 44 stalls for show rental, two classrooms and one common area and camper hookups for shows and travelers. It is home to the Ohio University Southern Reproduction Center, the Ohio Horse Park Center for Therapeutic Riding, Ohio University Southern Equine Studies Program, Ohio University Southern Southern Equestrian Teams, Ohio University Southern Community Lesson Program, and events from ten different organizations.

It also offers rental of facilities for shows and clinics to the public.

Two disciplines of horseback riding at four different levels are taught at the horse park. In the beginning level of either discipline, either Hunt Seat 1 or Western 1, the groundwork is laid for basic horse care, proper horse handling, and basic riding skills. The riding classes become more difficult at each subsequent level, and require that more and more of a student's time be spent at the horse park.

Ohio University Proctorville Center 

Ohio University Proctorville Center began offering classes in trailers at the Lawrence County Fairgrounds at Proctorville in the late-1970s. It moved to schools in Chesapeake and at Fairland before opening a new center on Ohio State Route 7 in downtown Proctorville in 1992. An increase in enrollment led to cramped conditions and calls for a new facility.

In 2000, Proctorville resident Marshall L. Smith donated land on Ohio State Route 775 for the new Proctorville Center. Ground breaking for the new building was held on July 12, 2005. It was completed in September 2006 for $4.9 million, most of which came from donations from the community. The new, permanent structure includes 14 classrooms, including a distance-learning room, a computer lab, a commons room and a resource room. The building is named Greg Smith Hall in honor of Marshall L. Smith's late son.

It offers numerous Ohio University Southern classes and many community-oriented classes, including ballroom dancing and computer basics.

References

External links 
 Official website

Public universities and colleges in Ohio
Educational institutions established in 1956
Ironton, Ohio
Education in Lawrence County, Ohio
Equestrian educational establishments
Libraries in Ohio
Ohio University
Civilian Conservation Corps in Ohio
Buildings and structures in Lawrence County, Ohio
Tourist attractions in Lawrence County, Ohio
1956 establishments in Ohio